Ţărmure may refer to several villages in Romania:

 Ţărmure, a village in Hălmagiu Commune, Arad County
 Ţărmure, a village in Sărmășag Commune, Sălaj County